Stephanie is a fictional character from the English-language and Icelandic-produced children's television show LazyTown. She inspires the citizens of the titular town to stay active. She has pink hair and as such is often referred to as 'Pinky' by the puppet character Trixie. She came to town to visit her uncle, Milford Meanswell, the mayor of LazyTown. Upon meeting the other children, she unsuccessfully attempted to get them to play along as opposed to staying at home playing video games and eating candy. This changed when Stephanie asked for the help of Sportacus. When he finally arrived, the whole town worked together to make LazyTown a more active place to live. Each episode of the show ends with Stephanie performing a song and dance routine to "Bing Bang", the show's ending theme.

In the Icelandic version of LazyTown, the character is called Solla Stirða, and her voice was dubbed in Icelandic by Ólöf Kristín Þorsteinsdóttir.

The role of Stephanie was performed by Julianna Rose Mauriello in seasons 1 and 2. In 2011, Julianna confirmed she would be leaving LazyTown, since she has grown too old to play the role of Stephanie. So she was replaced by Chloe Lang for seasons 3 and 4. Stephanie was also played by Kimberly Pena in LazyTown Live! The Pirate Adventure, a stage production that toured throughout the United Kingdom and Ireland in 2009.

Description
Stephanie was depicted  as being an athletic, sweet, shy, sassy caring, optimistic and smart 8-year-old girl. Surprised by the inactivity of the residents of LazyTown, she cheerfully encourages them to participate in more active, energetic hobbies or pastimes such as sports, games, tickling Stephanie, and much more when they are downhearted when the temptations of candy or video games overcome her prodding. Despite this, Stephanie is characterized by her optimism and self-confidence, which she proudly promotes and shares with her peers in encouragement against all odds or challenges, always victoriously triumphing over any obstacles or antagonists by the conclusion of an episode.

Stephanie's attempts are often nearly thwarted by Robbie Rotten, but his plans are never foolproof and always end with Stephanie winning.

Development
Stephanie was originally created by Magnús Scheving for the stage play Áfram Latibær as "Solla Stirða" ("Solla Stiff"), a girl with stiff joints who dreamt of becoming a dancer. Solla also appeared in the sequel to the stage play, Glanni Glæpur í Latabæ. She was played by Selma Björnsdóttir and Linda Ásgeirsdóttir, respectively.

Magnús Scheving reworked Solla into Stephanie for the LazyTown television show. Shelby Young was originally pegged to play Stephanie, and filmed one unaired pilot before departing due to union issues.

Ultimately, Julianna Rose Mauriello was chosen to play Stephanie, and played her for the first two seasons and LazyTown Extra before departing due to aging out of the role.

Chloe Lang picked up the role of Stephanie for seasons three and four, and as of 2022 is the most recent actress to play Stephanie.

Appearance
Stephanie tends to wear a pink sleeveless dress with pale pink tights, pink socks, white and pink sneakers and a purple hairband. Her outfit, though, changes from time to time. For example, in "LazyTown Goes Digital" and "Energy Book", she wears pink leggings with her usual dress. She also wears tracksuits and other items of clothing, but they are nearly always pink. Her short hair is dyed pink. All her accessories are also pink. She is often seen carrying a pink purse with a heart on it, in which she carries her pink diary. As a pirate, she wore a pink bandanna with a white, fancy letter "S" on it for Stephanie, as well as a striped shirt, ripped pink leggings,and pink socks.

Reception
Child development authors Lyn Mikel Brown and Sharon Lamb assert that Stephanie is interesting and makes pink a "power color" due to her quick thinking, computer gaming and sporty nature.

References

External links
 LazyTown character sketches at official website
 
 
 

Child characters in television
Child characters in musical theatre
Television characters introduced in 2004
Fictional dancers
Fictional singers
LazyTown
Fictional American people
Theatre characters introduced in 1996